Abderaouf Zemmouchi (born February 9, 1987, in Boufarik) is an Algerian footballer. He currently plays for MC Oran in the Algerian Ligue Professionnelle 1.

International career
In March 2005, Zemmouchi was called up to the Algerian Under-20 National Team for an international tournament in Mulhouse, France. In March 2006, Zemmouchi was called up again for a training camp in Algiers. He was also a member of the Algerian Under-20 team that played against Libya in the first round of qualifiers for the 2007 African Youth Championship.

References

External links
 DZFoot Profile
 

1987 births
Living people
People from Boufarik
Algerian footballers
USM Blida players
Algerian Ligue Professionnelle 1 players
MC Oran players
Algeria youth international footballers
Association football defenders
21st-century Algerian people